Mark Andrew White (born 1 April 1961) is an English singer, songwriter, composer, musician and record producer.

Born in Sheffield, England, White first entered the music industry in the late 1970s as lead vocalist and keyboardist of the electronic band Vice Versa. After releasing one studio album with the band in 1980, Vice Versa member Martin Fry emerged as lead vocalist and the band opted to transform into a new band called ABC. White resigned himself to composing ABC's music while also playing guitar and keyboards before retiring from music after the release of their sixth studio album, Abracadabra, in 1991. As ABC's keyboardist he used a variety of instruments, including the E-mu Emulator, the Yamaha DX7 and the Fairlight CMI.

In 2014, White came out of retirement to reform Vice Versa with Stephen Singleton.

Music career
In the late 1970s, White was a member of ABC's predecessor band, the three-piece electronic band Vice Versa. Other members of the trio were David Sydenham and future ABC saxophonist Stephen Singleton. After being interviewed by future ABC lead vocalist Martin Fry for his fanzine, Modern Drugs, the band members invited Fry to join the band as a keyboardist, and Vice Versa later evolved into ABC.

With Fry in place as lead vocalist and songwriter, Vice Versa changed its name to ABC and changed its sound to a contemporary pop style that at that time led them to be categorised with bands like Duran Duran, Spandau Ballet and the Human League. Between 1982 and 1991, ABC recorded six studio albums, The Lexicon of Love (1982), Beauty Stab (1983), How to Be a ... Zillionaire! (1985), Alphabet City (1987), Up (1989) and Abracadabra (1991), and released a greatest hits compilation album, Absolutely (1990). Together with Fry, White co-wrote and produced a couple of songs on Paul Rutherford's sole solo studio album Oh World (1989), including the single "Get Real". During this time, the band went through numerous personnel changes, with White and Fry being its only permanent members.

Later years
ABC disbanded in 1992, with White retiring from music to pursue an interest in reiki therapy. ABC reformed in 1997 without White, and Fry continued to tour under the band's name despite being its only official member. White declined to participate in VH1's Bands Reunited in 2004, when attempts were made to reform ABC for a one-off performance.

In 2014, White, together with Singleton, compiled the Vice Versa box set, Electrogenesis 1978–1980 which was released on VOD Records. This led to White coming out of retirement to reform the band. In December 2015 the duo released a Christmas single called "Little Drum Machine Boy", which was available to download for free on SoundCloud. They are currently writing and recording new material.

Discography
With Vice Versa

With ABC

References

External links
 
 
 
 
 

1961 births
20th-century English singers
21st-century English singers
20th-century English musicians
21st-century English musicians
ABC (band) members
British synth-pop new wave musicians
English keyboardists
English new wave musicians
English pop rock singers
English record producers
English rock guitarists
English songwriters
Living people
Mercury Records artists
Musicians from Sheffield
British pop rock musicians
Sophisti-pop musicians
Synth-pop singers
Vertigo Records artists
Reiki practitioners
English male guitarists